The seventh season of the police procedural drama NCIS premiered on September 22, 2009 with NCIS: Los Angeles Season 1 premiering afterwards. At the end of season six, Ziva had left the NCIS team in Israel, returning to work as a Mossad officer. In the closing seconds of that season, Ziva was shown to have been captured and tortured for information about NCIS.

In the first episode of season seven, Ziva is rescued by Gibbs, Tony and McGee and upon her return to Washington, she eventually becomes an NCIS agent after resigning from Mossad for good. Much of the season's story arc then focuses on the Mexican Drug War and Colonel Merton Bell (Robert Patrick), a suspected murderer who hired the lawyer M. Allison Hart to represent him. Hart quickly becomes a thorn in Gibbs' side by regularly showing up and protecting possible suspects while they are being investigated, claiming that they were her clients.

The season draws to a close as Gibbs is later kidnapped by someone working for Paloma Reynosa, the daughter of the late Pedro Hernandez, a drug dealer Gibbs himself shot dead twenty years previously as Hernandez had been responsible for killing Gibbs' first wife Shannon and daughter Kelly. While Gibbs is held prisoner, Paloma informs him that he would work for her or she would have everyone he ever knew and cared about die if he did not go through with her demands.

It also ends in a cliffhanger with Paloma herself traveling to Stillwater and confronting Jackson Gibbs in his shop, leaving his fate unknown.

The series aired alongside season one of NCIS: Los Angeles, and the NCIS episode "Endgame" continued on the events that had taken place in the NCIS: Los Angeles episode "Killshot".

Cast

Main 
 Mark Harmon as Leroy Jethro Gibbs, NCIS Supervisory Special Agent (SSA) of the Major Case Response Team (MCRT) assigned to Washington's Navy Yard
 Michael Weatherly as Anthony DiNozzo, NCIS Senior Special Agent, second in command of MCRT
 Cote de Pablo as Ziva David, NCIS Probationary Special Agent, former Mossad Liaison Officer
 Pauley Perrette as Abby Sciuto, Forensic Specialist for NCIS
 Sean Murray as Timothy McGee, NCIS Special Agent
 Rocky Carroll as Leon Vance, NCIS Director 
 David McCallum as Dr. Donald "Ducky" Mallard, Chief Medical Examiner for NCIS

Also starring 
 Brian Dietzen as Jimmy Palmer, Assistant Medical Examiner for NCIS

Recurring 
 Joe Spano as Tobias Fornell, FBI Senior Special Agent
 Darby Stanchfield as Shannon Gibbs, Gibbs' deceased wife
 Muse Watson as Mike Franks, retired Senior Special Agent for NCIS and Gibbs' former boss
 Paul Telfer as Corporal Damon Werth
 Kent Shocknek as Guy Ross, ZNN news anchor
 Aviva Baumann as young Shannon Gibbs, Gibbs' deceased wife
 Ralph Waite as Jackson Gibbs, Gibbs' father
 Paula Newsome as Jackie Vance, Leon Vance's wife
 Omid Abtahi as Saleem Ulman, NCIS target
 Robert Wagner as Anthony DiNozzo, Sr., Tony's father
 Michelle Pierce as Breena Slater, Jimmy Palmer's girlfriend
 Jackie Geary as Susan Grady, NCIS Polygraph Specialist
 Jack Conley as Danny Sportelli, Metro P.D. Detective 
 Diane Neal as Abigail Borin, CGIS Special Agent in Charge
 TJ Ramini as Malachi Ben-Gidon, Mossad Agent
 Marco Sanchez as Alejandro Rivera, official in the Mexican Justice Department
 Jacqueline Obradors as Paloma Reynosa, leader of a Mexican drug cartel
 Meredith Eaton as Carol Wilson, immunologist and friend of Abby Sciuto
 Rena Sofer as Margaret Allison Hart, Attorney
 Todd Lowe as Chad Dunham, NCIS Special Agent

Episodes

Ratings

References

General references 
 
 
 
 

2009 American television seasons
2010 American television seasons
NCIS 07